The Diocese of Nelson  is one of the 13 dioceses and hui amorangi of the Anglican Church in Aotearoa, New Zealand and Polynesia. The Diocese covers the northern part of the South Island of New Zealand, which is mostly the area north of a line drawn from Greymouth to Kaikoura.

The diocese was founded in 1858 and the seat of the Bishop is at Christ Church Cathedral in Nelson.

On 31 August 2019 Stephen Maina Mwangi was ordained and installed as Bishop of Nelson Diocese.

Nelson diocese is a noted Evangelical diocese, drawing similarities with the Anglican Diocese of Sydney, in Australia.

List of bishops

Archdeaconries
In 1866, the sole archdeaconry — of Waimea — was vacant.

Archdeacon of Waimea
?–1859 (res.): R. B. Paul
1859–1874: vacant
1874–1880 (res.): Thorpe
1880–?: C. O. Mules
1956–1966 (res.): Harold Ault

Archdeacon of Wairau
1868–1886 (d.): H. F. Butt
Archdeacon of Māwhera
1886–?: Thomas Billing Maclean

References

External links
 Diocese of Nelson
 Nelson Cathedral

Religious organizations established in 1858
Nelson
Nelson, New Zealand
1858 establishments in New Zealand
Archdeacons of Marlborough
Archdeacons of Waimea
Archdeacons of Māwhera
Archdeacons of Nelson